Psychrogeton is a genus of plants in the tribe Astereae within the family Asteraceae.

It is native to Iran, Central Asia, and Anatolia.

 Species

 formerly included
several species transferred to other genera: Erigeron Rhinactinidia

References

Astereae
Asteraceae genera
Taxa named by Pierre Edmond Boissier